The Shuffle! light novel and anime series features an extensive cast of characters designed by Aoi Nishimata and Hiro Suzuhira. The series takes place in a fictional universe where humans live in harmony with gods, and devils. The protagonist is Rin Tsuchimi, a high school student from Verbena Academy who lives with his childhood friend Kaede Fuyou.

Shuffle!
This is a list of characters that were introduced in Shuffle!. They are presented in the order they are given of the omake section of the game.

Main 
The main player character and the five heroines from the anime are listed here.

Rin Tsuchimi

 is the player character in the Shuffle games and the male protagonist in the anime series. He is a 17-year-old high school student. As noted by Kaede, Rin's main virtue is his kindness. This is both his greatest strength, as the girls love him because of this, and his greatest weakness, as shown later in the series by his indecisiveness and goal to make everyone happy, which usually ends up hurting them instead. Rin tends to show minimal initiative when dealing with the girls around him (mostly because of the abuse he receives from his fellow male classmates over his perceived relationship with his childhood friend Kaede). However, he starts to spend more and more time with both Lisianthus (Sia) and Nerine after they arrive and starts to develop feelings for them. With regards to Kaede, he thinks of her as a childhood friend only. When people comment that he and Kaede would make a good couple, Rin either waves it off or says that it is strange to think of it that way. This distance between them is caused in part by Kaede and Rin's dark past when both Rin's parents and Kaede's mother were killed during their travel when Rin and Kaede were kids. Rin reluctantly took the blame for it, causing Kaede to hate him during their childhood.

Kaede Fuyou
, Ran Tōno (PC)
 is Rin's childhood best friend who grew up with him in the same house after her mother and Rin's parents died during their travel. Rin reluctantly took blame for it, causing Kaede to hate him and wish him dead. Some time after they started junior high school, Kaede found out about the real truth about her mother's death and felt bad about hating Rin and wishing him dead. Ever since then, she started taking care of Rin, doing everything from housework to making his meals. She is very down-to-earth, modest, polite and soft-spoken. However, when something greatly upsets or shocks her, she shows signs of psychosis and even violence. In the anime, when Rin spends too much time with Asa, Kaede pins Asa to the wall and tells her to die and that Rin is and always will be hers. But when Rin refuses to accept Kaede's feelings towards him, she contemplates suicide until Rin stops her, telling Kaede he loves her but not in a romantic way. In the original game, this is only visible in the back story: after her mother died during her return trip home, she abused Rin because she blamed him for her mom's death. To shock Kaede out of her apathetic state after her mother's death, Rin told that her mother and his parents were returning from their trip because he begged for them to return, when in fact it was Kaede who had gotten sick and they were returning so that her mother could look after her. He endured her abuse so that she wouldn't blame herself and fall into despair and depression. When she learned the truth of the matter, Kaede resolved to atone for all of her past misdeeds by serving Rin. In fact, it became her raison d'être and although Rin was not really comfortable with the idea, he was afraid of Kaede suffering a relapse by not allowing her to punish herself in this way. Kaede has romantic feelings for Rin, but considers herself unworthy to be loved by Rin or to stay by Rin's side. For Rin's part, he cares deeply about Kaede but more as a sister than romantically. In the anime, she comes to terms with Rin's lack of romantic feelings for her, and her own feelings for Rin, and she resolves to continue loving him.

Asa Shigure
, Sumire Takarazuka (PC)
 is Rin's friend and senior. In the anime she is sometimes called "Shocking Shigure", much to her disappointment. She is a cambion (half-human/half-demon) but keeps this a secret. While she has a weak constitution (due to her body not being able to handle the magic powers she inherited from her mother), she makes up for it with her energetic personality. Even though she is half-human/half-demon she does not have the long ears typical of demons as seen in episode 14. Her mother explains this to Rin and tells him that although Asa is half-demon, her body is 'from her father and in almost all respects human. Despite being a bit of a tomboy (because she refers to herself with boku (ボク or 僕), a Japanese word for "I" mainly used by males), she is an excellent cook. She often uses English loan words and is notable for saying "Hello!" in English—a greeting which is her catchphrase. She likes to flirt and tease Rin, sometimes greeting him with big smacks on the back. It is later revealed that numerous guys have confessed to her only to be shot down. In the game, it is hinted that she may have feelings for Rin; as Asa admits to him, saying, "But if it's Rin-chan, it might be good to fall in love..." In the anime, she is the heroine whom Rin chooses.

Primula
, Minami Hokuto (PC)
, nicknamed , is a strange, stoic and calm girl who is often seen carrying one of two stuffed cats around—a present from Rin to her or a stuffed cat which Nerine gave to Lycoris who, in turn, gave it to Primula before she died. She is the third artificial life form created from a result of the gods' and devils' experiments. She escaped the facility and came to the human world in order to search for Rin because Lycoris had told her about him. Primula has good relationships with the other clones, because she was Lycoris's sister. Most of the time she shows either very little or no emotions whatsoever. According to Forbesii and Eustoma, it's not that she lacks emotions, but rather that, due to being raised in isolation in the laboratory, she simply doesn't know how to express them. She was not close to anyone but Lycoris, whom she looked up to as a sister. During her route in the game (and a couple of other routes in Shuffle! Essence+), she starts to trust Rin enough to start showing her real personality; that of an extremely happy and bubbly girl. Additionally, with her young appearance, Primula serves to fill the lolicon niche of the series. In the anime, there are hints that she has some prophetic ability; she warns Rin and Kaede of an earthquake a few moments before it happens and she starts making herbal medicine for Kaede's cold before the latter even exhibits the symptoms. Primula would not start school until the end of the series.

Lisianthus 
, Rumiko Sasa (PC)
, known in the anime by her nickname , is the daughter of the King of Gods and came to the human world as a possible marriage candidate for Rin. She and Nerine are cousins, as her mother is Forbesii's sister. She has a very energetic personality and is very optimistic. Although she struggles with academics, she is an excellent cook. Her magical capability is poor, but she makes up for it with brute force by hitting people with objects ranging from chairs to tables. Towards the end of her route, it is revealed that Lisianthus has two personalities; her own, and that of her twin sister who was more devil than god and therefore could not be allowed to be born. While still in the womb, Sia decided to save her sister by allowing her soul to reside inside of her own. The twin's personality emerges (takes control of Sia's body) when Sia is depressed or when she feels that Sia should be more aggressive towards Rin. Rin gives the twin the name , which belonged to his deceased mother. In Shuffle! Essence+, Kikyou gets an extended ending where she and Sia are able to be separated and thereby co-exist together. In the non-Lisianthus routes, Sia confesses to Rin that, although he might not return her feelings of love, she will keep on loving him because the world of the gods allows polygamy. She tells this to Itsuki when rejecting his advances.

Nerine 
, Yuki Matsunaga (PC)
, known to Sia as Rin (Rina in the English dub), is the daughter of the King of Demons and, like Sia, is also a marriage candidate for Rin. Nerine is a more capable magic user than her cousin, Sia, and occasionally uses it to devastating effect. Similar to Sia, Nerine has absorbed the spirit of her clone, . Nerine and Lycoris can be distinguished from each other by the color of their eyes; Nerine has red eyes, while those of Lycoris are blue. Lycoris saved Nerine from an incurable illness at the cost of her own life. However, unlike Sia, this has not led her to develop multiple personalities and Nerine only shares Lycoris' emotions and singing voice. Nerine is very shy, respectful, and speaks in an extremely formal way. She enjoys getting to know and learn about her peers. Although her cooking skills are rather poor, her magic capabilities are quite impressive, with enough destructive power to level entire city blocks. Her grades in school are also excellent. Initially, Nerine becomes a bit depressed when seeing Rin with Sia, but after her confession to Rin about Lycoris' identity and her own love for Rin (which had blossomed during her effort to fulfill Lycoris' last wish), she decides it would be better if she were dead. Concerned, Rin challenges her to a game; if he can find where she is at five o'clock the next day, then the show goes on. When he finds her, he tells her that he can understand what Lycoris wanted and that she needs to sing and smile as herself, or else Lycoris can't do so with her.

Supporting

Kareha

 is Asa's friend and classmate from the realm of the gods. They are often seen together. She has a habit of saying "Maa! Maa!! Maa!!!" (translated as "My! My!! My!!!", or "Ooh! La! La!!! in the English Dubbed) whenever she sees something romantic or cute, and starts to daydream, much to the chagrin of her peers. She works part-time as a waitress in the cafe that Rin and the other characters visit frequently. She also has a younger sister named Tsubomi, who had a cameo in the series' final episode, is introduced in the On the Stage version of the game, and has her own route in Shuffle! Essence+ where she reveals that she has been interested in Rin since they met.

Mayumi Thyme
, Nasumi Katori (PC)
 is a half-demon and half-human girl with heterochromia. She is Rin's classmate, a good friend of Kaede, and always looking for the latest gossip. She has the smallest bust in the series, often made fun of by Itsuki. Nonetheless, she takes pride in her small breasts, rationalizing that by being below average, they are a rarity sought after by a select group of men. She may have feelings for Itsuki, despite their frequent quarreling. It is revealed in Shuffle! Essence+ that she and Itsuki are indeed childhood friends.

Itsuki Midoriba

 is Rin's classmate and "bad" friend. He addresses himself as "oresama": a more arrogant version of "ore" (the masculine word for "I" in Japanese). Being the Don Juan of the class, he is envious of the girls' attraction to Rin and often mentions that he will take care of the girls he doesn't choose. Itsuki and Mayumi often fight over comments made about Mayumi's small chest. It is revealed in the visual novel that he harbors strong feelings of love for Mayumi due to her flat chest, while his outward insults of them are just to get a rise out of her.

Nadeshiko Benibara
, Mari Oda (PC)
 is Rin's homeroom teacher. She is single, attractive, and is frequently the victim of pickup lines, including from the King of Demons and Itsuki. She appears to have had some martial arts training (being able to slice a bottle with her bare hand). Students fear her because she is known to hand out severe punishments for minor offenses, such as writing 100-page reports and dragging a tire around the track.

Eustoma  
, Gorō Hama (PC)
He is big, musclebound, and enjoys drinking sake. Despite his best intentions, he often embarrasses his daughter. It is a running gag in the series that she has to hit him with a chair to curb his enthusiasm. He has three wives, introduced in volume 2, chapter 10, page 16 in Shuffle!- Days of the Bloom. Cineraria, Sia's mother, is the only Demon he has as a wife. The other two, Lilac (A shorter-haired woman) and Iris (a long-haired lady), may be humans or Gods.

Lilac
The shorter-haired wife of Eustoma. She and Iris are only mentioned in the anime and introduced in the manga. She and Cineraria both have a habit of hitting their husband when he's being stupid or embarrassing. Instead of a chair, though, she is seen with brass knuckles.

Iris
The longer-haired wife of Eustoma. Unlike her fellow wives of Eustoma, she doesn't hit him when he acts embarrassing and seems not to be much of a talker since she barely talks when her fellow wives take care of Eustoma.

Forbesii
, Sagano Shiba (PC)
He is a lustful character and thus gets along well with Itsuki. Like the King of Gods, he too has a habit of embarrassing his daughter, which usually leads to Nerine addressing him as "Devil King" instead of "Father" as punishment, much to his displeasure.

Ama Shigure

 is Asa's mother and the first test subject experimented on by the gods and demons. Many game players assume the gods and demons created her. Yet, the anime revealed that she actually was a normal demon who chose to be experimented on. She has the habit of drastically reducing names to cute nicknames (Asa for instance, is referred to as "A-chan"). She also wears a cat-ear hat (which hides her demon ears from casual sight). She looks abnormally young to be a mother, and it surprises the other characters to learn that she is quite a bit older than she looks. This has caused Asa several headaches from going to the police station and convincing the police that her mother wasn't a lost child. Due to the experiment that transported her to the human world, her magical power was greatly enhanced (although she hasn't been seen using her magic) and was passed on to Asa, who suffered a lot growing up due to her human body not being able to handle it well.

Tsubomi
Voiced by Ryōko Tanaka (Japanese - PS2), Hikaru Isshiki (Japanese - Really? Really!), Brina Palencia (English)
 is a character in Navel's Shuffle! media franchise. She is Kareha's younger sister. Like Kareha, she tends to be swayed in the presence of something romantic or cute.  Her catchphrase is "Kya! Kya! Kya!". Her first appearance is in Shuffle! On the Stage during Kareha's path. She returns as a secondary character in Really? Really! and has her own route in Shuffle! Essence+. She also makes small cameo appearances in the 22nd and 24th episodes of the Shuffle! anime. Tsubomi (蕾) is the Japanese word for 'flower bud'.

Tick! Tack!
The following characters are introduced in Tick! Tack!

Sage
 is a character in Navel's Shuffle! media franchise. She is introduced as the main character in Tick! Tack! and appears as a secondary character in Really? Really!

In Tick! Tack!, Sage (she is called Se-chan by Mayumi and red form Nerine) is Forbesii's maid. In the expected timeline, she married him and is the mother of the true Nerine. Sage is introduced when Nerine's group discover the entry to Forbesii's mansion. Nerine's friends are surprised when she reveals that Sage is her mother.

When they travel into the past, Rin and the others find that Sage is energetic and cheerful in almost all circumstances. She is a great housekeeper and good at hiding her feelings, especially towards Forbesii, to whom she is devoted. However, since Forbesii is a prince and she is just his maid, Sage does her utmost to be Forbesii's maid in the hope that she can stay in his service after he marries his fiancée, Ai. But after several encounters with her master (e.g., in the kitchen, when Forbesii tries to cook), Sage feels more and more attracted to him. She later confesses to Rin that she loves Forbesii and is concerned that her feelings will not be reciprocated no matter how hard she tries.

In the original timeline, Forbesii proposed to Sage after she gave him a New Year gift. 
In the altered timeline, due to the presence of Rin and company in the past, Forbesii's proposal to Sage happens after Sage and Rin talk at the shore of a lake, and she reveals that she loves Forbesii. When Forbesii appears unexpectedly, Sage cannot face her master, runs away, and falls into the lake. Forbesii saves her and finds that Sage has caught a terrible cold on returning to the mansion. While Rin watches over her as she sleeps, Forbesii tells Rin how he feels about Sage and proposes to her the following day.

However, suppose the player makes specific choices and decides to pursue Sage as a love interest rather than get her and Forbessi together. In that case, this event does not occur, and Nerine's hair turns red due to being born from Ai instead. In this case, Sage then falls in love and has intercourse with Rin, changing the original timeline's Nerine's personality and hair color. However, after Rin and company return to the present, Sage does not reappear. In contrast to Ai's ending with Rin, where she waits and meets him after he visits Nerine's house in the present. No specific explanation is given as to why Sage does not reappear to meet Rin in the altered timeline of pursuing her love.

Following the theme of characters from Shuffle! being named according to flowers, her name refers to the Salvia genus  of flowering plants, more commonly known as sage.

Sage was designed by Hiro Suzuhira.
She is voiced by Yukari Aoyama.

Ai
 is a character in Navel's Shuffle! media franchise. She is introduced as the main character in Tick! Tack!.

Ai was Forbesii's fiancée in the past. She is ladylike and may be a part of the Royal Family of the Demon World. She is well-educated, graceful, and gentle and is always seen smiling sweetly (even when she is sad and crying). Her speech, thoughts, and actions can be considered 'Big-Sisterly'. She often refers to herself as 'Ai-Onee San (Big sister Ai)' when talking to Rin and even with those who seem to be older than she is (e.g., Forbesii).

Ai has several 'over-leisurely' habits, including taking long baths (according to her, her average time in the bathroom is about 4 hours) or lazing time away enjoying the cool breeze on the mansion's balcony.

At they first meet her, Rin and the others believe that Ai is Nerine's mother since Nerine shares her grace and has a similar physical appearance.

In the main timeline, Ai seemed to know that Forbesii and Sage had feelings for one another and encouraged Sage to state her feelings. However, it seemed more like a way of making fun of her. Despite loving Forbesii more than anyone else, she was willing to break their engagement to allow him to marry Sage, whom he loved.

Suppose the timeline is altered so that Ai marries Forbesii. In that case, she becomes the mother of the alternate, red-haired Nerine.

When Rin and the others return from the past and assume that history has been restored, they discover that Ai fell in love with Rin and has waited for 20 years to meet him again, rejecting numerous proposals in the interim.

Ai (藍) is the Japanese word for Persicaria tinctoria, or the Japanese indigo. Since her name is written in katakana, it can also carry a secondary meaning of 'love' (愛).

Ai was designed by Hiro Suzuhira.
She is voiced by Sachiko Mimura.

Cineraria
 is a character in Navel's Shuffle! media franchise. She has a small cameo appearance in the first Shuffle! game, but her real introduction is in Tick! Tack!

Cineraria is Forbesii's younger sister. She is one of Eustoma's wives and the mother of Lisianthus, making her Nerine's aunt and Sage's sister-in-law.

The characters of Shuffle! have a theme of being named after plants. Cineraria is genus of flowering plants that, like the nerine, is native to southern Africa.

Cineraria was designed by Hiro Suzuhira.
She is voiced by Anna Akashi.

Bark
 is a character in Navel's Shuffle! media franchise. His only appearance is as a secondary character in Tick! Tack!, where he is Forbesii's butler.

His name, Bark, is a reference to tree bark and not the sound a dog makes.

Bark was designed by Hiro Suzuhira.
He is voiced by Yamato Ken.

Really? Really!
The following characters in the Shuffle franchise are introduced in Really? Really!.

Sakura Yae
 is a character in Navel's Shuffle! media franchise. She is one of the main characters in the Really? Really! visual novels. She also appears in the Visual Novel Shuffle! Essence+.

Yae Sakura (八重 桜), her full name in the Japanese order, is a Japanese term that means 'double-flowered cherry blossom'. Sakura (桜) is the Japanese name for ornamental cherry trees, Prunus serrulata, and their blossoms.

Sakura Yae is voiced by Mai Goto and designed by Aoi Nishimata.

Mikio Fuyou
 is a character in Navel's Shuffle! media franchise. He is Kaede Fuyou's father and the husband of Momiji Fuyou. His only appearance in the visual novels is as a secondary character in Really? Really!, but has minor cameo appearances in the Shuffle! anime.

Mikio Fuyou was designed by Hiro Suzuhira.

His surname, fuyō (芙蓉), refers to the Hibiscus mutabilis, while his given name, mikio (幹夫) means "three trees together".

Momiji Fuyou
 is a character in Navel's Really? Really! media franchise. She is Kaede Fuyou's mother and the wife of Mikio Fuyou. Her only appearance in the visual novels as a secondary character in Really? Really!.

Her given name, Momiji (紅葉), is the Japanese word for Japanese Maple (Acer palmatum). This ties in with her daughter's name, Kaede, referring to the maple genus. Her surname, fuyō (芙蓉), refers to the Hibiscus mutabilis.

Momiji Fuyou was designed by Aoi Nishimata.

Shuffle! Essence+
The following characters are introduced in the Shuffle! Essence+.

Daisy
 is a character in Navel's Shuffle! media franchise. Her only appearance in the visual novels is as the main character in Shuffle! Essence+. She's a transfer student from the Realm of Gods, likes Sia a lot, and is the lone member of Verbena's Broadcast Club. Part of her story will be getting everyone else involved in the club.

Daisy was designed by Aoi Nishimata.

Komugi Nishida voices her.

Ruri Matsuri
 is a character in Navel's Shuffle! media franchise. Her only appearance in the visual novels is as a secondary character in Shuffle! Essence+ and the main character in the last route in Shuffle! Love Rainbow. She's a member of Sia's personal guard from the Realm of Gods. In Shuffle! Essence+ she prefers wearing the boys' uniform over the girls' one. Outwardly she seems very cold, but she's got a pleasant and serene personality. She also may not be much for acting girly either. However, in Shuffle! Love Rainbow, from the start, she shows a girly side, but we also meet her when she is wearing a boys' uniform and acting as one.

Ruri Matsuri was designed by Aoi Nishimata.

She is voiced by Aoi Mukai.

Erica Suzuran
 is a character in Navel's Shuffle! media franchise. Her only appearance in the visual novels is as a secondary character in Shuffle! Essence+.

Erica Suzuran was designed by Aoi Nishimata.

Tsubaki Yuki voices her.

Notes

References

Shuffle!